Come and Get It may refer to:

Literature and films 
 Come and Get It (novel), a 1935 novel by Edna Ferber
 Come and Get It (1936 film), a 1936 adaption of the novel starring Joel McCrea, Edward Arnold and Frances Farmer
 Come and Get It (1929 film), a lost 1929 American silent action film

Albums 
 Come an' Get It,  a 1981 album by Whitesnake
 Come and Get It: A Tribute to Badfinger, a 1996 album by various artist
 Come and Get It (Rachel Stevens album), 2005
 Come and Get It (Westbound Train album), 2009
 Come and Get It: The Best of Apple Records, a 2010 compilation album
 Come and Get It: The Rare Pearls, a 2012 album by the Jackson 5

Songs 
 "Come and Get It" (Badfinger song), a song written by Paul McCartney and released by Badfinger in 1969
 "Come and Get It" (Dannii Minogue song), 2004
 "Come and Get It" (John Newman song), 2015
 "Come & Get It" (Selena Gomez song), 2013
 "Come and Get It", a song by AC/DC from Stiff Upper Lip
 "Come and Get It", a song by Judas Priest from Ram It Down
 "Come & Get It", a song by Krewella
 "Come and Get It", an anthem for the Las Vegas Raiders written by Ice Cube
"Come and Get It", a song by The Dollyrots from Barefoot and Pregnant
 "Come and Get It", a song by Overkill from The Electric Age

See also 
 Come Get It (disambiguation)
 Come and take it